Nesticus is a genus of American and Eurasian scaffold web spiders first described by Tamerlan Thorell in 1869.

Species 
 it contains the following species:

  Nesticus abukumanus Yaginuma, 1979 — Japan
  Nesticus acrituberculum Kim, Yoo, Lee, Lee, Choi & Lim, 2014 — Korea
  Nesticus afghanus Roewer, 1962 — Afghanistan
  Nesticus akamai Yaginuma, 1979 — Japan
  Nesticus akiensis Yaginuma, 1979 — Japan
  Nesticus akiyoshiensis (Uyemura, 1941) — Japan
  Nesticus akiyoshiensis ofuku Yaginuma, 1977 — Japan
  Nesticus ambiguus Denis, 1950 — Tanzania
  Nesticus anagamianus Yaginuma, 1976 — Japan
  Nesticus antillanus Bryant, 1940 — Cuba
  Nesticus archeri Gertsch, 1984 — USA
  Nesticus arganoi Brignoli, 1972 — Mexico
  Nesticus asuwanus Nishikawa, 1986 — Japan
  Nesticus bacchus Estol & Rodrigues, 2017 — Brazil
  Nesticus balacescui Dumitrescu, 1979 — Romania
  Nesticus barri Gertsch, 1984 — USA
  Nesticus barrowsi Gertsch, 1984 — USA
  Nesticus bishopi Gertsch, 1984 — USA
  Nesticus brasiliensis Brignoli, 1979 — Brazil
  Nesticus breviscapus Yaginuma, 1979 — Japan
  Nesticus brignolii Ott & Lise, 2002 — Brazil, Uruguay, Argentina
  Nesticus brimleyi Gertsch, 1984 — USA
  Nesticus bungonus Yaginuma, 1979 — Japan
  Nesticus calilegua Ott & Lise, 2002 — Brazil, Argentina
  Nesticus campus Gertsch, 1984 — Mexico
  Nesticus carolinensis (Bishop, 1950) — USA
  Nesticus carpaticus Dumitrescu, 1979 — Romania
  Nesticus carteri Emerton, 1875 — USA
  Nesticus caverna Gertsch, 1984 — Mexico
  Nesticus cellulanus (Clerck, 1757) — Holarctic
 Nesticus cellulanus affinis Kulczynski, 1894 — Slovakia, Romania
  Nesticus cernensis Dumitrescu, 1979 — Romania
  Nesticus chikunii Yaginuma, 1980 — Japan
  Nesticus citrinus (Taczanowski, 1874) — Guyana
  Nesticus concolor Roewer, 1962 — Afghanistan
 Nesticus constantinescui Dumitrescu, 1979 — Romania
  Nesticus cooperi Gertsch, 1984 — USA
  Nesticus coreanus Paik & Namkung, 1969 — Korea
  Nesticus crosbyi Gertsch, 1984 — USA
  Nesticus delfini (Simon, 1904) — Chile
  Nesticus diaconui Dumitrescu, 1979 — Romania
  Nesticus dilutus Gertsch, 1984 — USA
  Nesticus echigonus Yaginuma, 1986 — Japan
  Nesticus flavidus Paik, 1978 — Korea
  Nesticus furenensis Yaginuma, 1979 — Japan
  Nesticus furtivus Gertsch, 1984 — USA
  Nesticus gastropodus Kim & Ye, 2014 — Korea
  Nesticus georgia Gertsch, 1984 — USA
  Nesticus gertschi Coyle & McGarity, 1992 — USA
  Nesticus gondai Yaginuma, 1979 — Japan
  Nesticus gujoensis Yaginuma, 1979 — Japan
  Nesticus higoensis Yaginuma, 1977 — Japan
  Nesticus hoffmanni Gertsch, 1971 — Mexico
  Nesticus holsingeri Gertsch, 1984 — USA
  Nesticus inconcinnus Simon, 1907 — São Tomé
  Nesticus ionescui Dumitrescu, 1979 — Romania
  Nesticus iriei Yaginuma, 1979 — Japan
  Nesticus ivone Faleiro & Santos, 2011 — Brazil
  Nesticus iwatensis Yaginuma, 1979 — Japan
  Nesticus jamesoni Gertsch, 1984 — Mexico
  Nesticus jonesi Gertsch, 1984 — USA
  Nesticus kaiensis Yaginuma, 1979 — Japan
  Nesticus karyuensis Yaginuma, 1980 — Japan
  Nesticus kataokai Yaginuma, 1979 — Japan
  Nesticus kunisakiensis Irie, 1999 — Japan
  Nesticus kuriko Yaginuma, 1972 — Japan
  Nesticus kyongkeomsanensis Namkung, 2002 — Korea
  Nesticus latiscapus Yaginuma, 1972 — Japan
 Nesticus latiscapus kosodensis Yaginuma, 1972 — Japan
  Nesticus lindbergi Roewer, 1962 — Afghanistan
  Nesticus longiscapus Yaginuma, 1976 — Japan
 Nesticus longiscapus awa Yaginuma, 1978 — Japan
 Nesticus longiscapus draco Yaginuma, 1978 — Japan
 Nesticus longiscapus kiuchii Yaginuma, 1978 — Japan
  Nesticus maculatus Bryant, 1948 — Hispaniola
  Nesticus masudai Yaginuma, 1979 — Japan
  Nesticus mikawanus Yaginuma, 1979 — Japan
  Nesticus mimus Gertsch, 1984 — USA
  Nesticus monticola Yaginuma, 1979 — Japan
  Nesticus nahuanus Gertsch, 1971 — Mexico
  Nesticus nasicus Coyle & McGarity, 1992 — USA
  Nesticus nishikawai Yaginuma, 1979 — Japan
  Nesticus noroensis Mashibara, 1993 — Japan
  Nesticus orghidani Dumitrescu, 1979 — Romania
  Nesticus paynei Gertsch, 1984 — USA
  Nesticus pecki Hedin & Dellinger, 2005 — USA
  Nesticus plesai Dumitrescu, 1980 — Romania
  Nesticus potreiro Ott & Lise, 2002 — Brazil
  Nesticus potterius (Chamberlin, 1933) — USA
  Nesticus rainesi Gertsch, 1984 — Mexico
  Nesticus rakanus Yaginuma, 1976 — Japan
  Nesticus ramirezi Ott & Lise, 2002 — Argentina
  Nesticus reclusus Gertsch, 1984 — USA
  Nesticus reddelli Gertsch, 1984 — Mexico
  Nesticus salta Torres, Pardo, González-Reyes, Rodríguez Artigas & Corronca, 2016 — Argentina
  Nesticus secretus Gertsch, 1984 — USA
  Nesticus sedatus Gertsch, 1984 — Mexico
  Nesticus sheari Gertsch, 1984 — USA
  Nesticus shinkaii Yaginuma, 1979 — Japan
  Nesticus shureiensis Yaginuma, 1980 — Japan
  Nesticus silvanus Gertsch, 1984 — USA
 Nesticus silvestrii Fage, 1929 — USA
  Nesticus sodanus Gertsch, 1984 — USA
  Nesticus sonei Yaginuma, 1981 — Japan
  Nesticus stupkai Gertsch, 1984 — USA
  Nesticus stygius Gertsch, 1984 — USA
  Nesticus suzuka Yaginuma, 1979 — Japan
  Nesticus taim Ott & Lise, 2002 — Brazil
  Nesticus takachiho Yaginuma, 1979 — Japan
  Nesticus tarumii Yaginuma, 1979 — Japan
  Nesticus tennesseensis (Petrunkevitch, 1925) — USA
  Nesticus tosa Yaginuma, 1976 — Japan
  Nesticus tosa iwaya Yaginuma, 1976 — Japan
  Nesticus tosa niyodo Yaginuma, 1976 — Japan
  Nesticus unicolor Simon, 1895 — Venezuela
  Nesticus utatsuensis Tanikawa & Yawata, 2013 — Japan
  Nesticus vazquezae Gertsch, 1971 — Mexico
  Nesticus wiehlei Dumitrescu, 1979 — Romania
  Nesticus yaginumai Irie, 1987 — Japan
  Nesticus yamagatensis Yoshida, 1989 — Japan
  Nesticus yamato Yaginuma, 1979 — Japan
  Nesticus yeongchigulensis Kim, Ye & Kim, 2016 — Korea
  Nesticus yesoensis Yaginuma, 1979 — Japan
  Nesticus zenjoensis Yaginuma, 1978 — Japan

See also 
 List of Nesticidae species

References

External links 

Araneomorphae genera
Spiders of Asia
Spiders of Africa
Spiders of North America
Spiders of South America
Taxa named by Tamerlan Thorell